Ali-Asghar Seyed-Ghorab (born 1968) is an Iranian literary scholar and Professor of Persian and Iranian Studies at Utrecht University. Previously, he was Associate Professor of Persian Language and Literature in the Department of Middle Eastern Studies at Leiden University. He is a fellow of the Young Academy of the Royal Netherlands Academy of Arts and Sciences.

Books 
 Martyrdom, Mysticism and Dissent: The Poetry of the 1979 Iranian Revolution and the Iran–Iraq War (1980–1988), de Gruyter, 2021
 The True Dream: Indictment of the Shiite Clerics of Isfahan, with S. McGlinn, Routledge, 2017
 Soefism: Een levende traditie, Prometheus / Bert Bakker, 2015
 Literature of the Early Twentieth Century: From the Constitutional Period to Reza Shah (ed.), I.B. Tauris 2015
 Layli and Majnun: Love, Madness and Mystic Longing in Nizami’s Epic Romance, Brill, 2003
 Mirror of Dew: The Poetry of Ālam-Tāj Zhāle Qā’em-Maqāmi, Harvard University Press, Ilex Foundation Series 14, 2015
 Metaphor and Imagery in Persian Poetry (ed.), Brill, 2012
 The Great Omar Khayyam: A Global Reception, (ed.), Leiden University Press, 2012
 Courtly Riddles: Enigmatic Embellishments in Early Persian Poetry, Leiden University Press, 2008, 2010
 The Treasury of Tabriz: the Great Il-Khanid Compendium, co-editor with S. McGlinn, Purdue University Press, 2007
 Gog and Magog: The Clans of Chaos in World Literature, with F. Doufikar-Aerts & S. McGlinn, Purdue University Press,  2007
 Conflict and Development in Iranian Film, co-editor with K. Talattof, Leiden University Press, 2013

References

External links
Personal Website

Iranologists
Living people
Iranian literary critics
Academic staff of Leiden University
Academic staff of Utrecht University
1968 births